Mlad Borec (Macedonian Cyrillic: Млад Борец) was a weekly magazine in Socialist Republic of Macedonia and later Macedonia (now North Macedonia). The motto of the magazine was "with youth - for the youth".

References

Newspapers published in North Macedonia
Newspapers published in Yugoslavia
Magazines published in North Macedonia